The Fourth National Census of Population of the Dominican Republic was raised on 7 August 1960, during the presidency of Joaquín Balaguer, after a decree issued by his predecessor Héctor Trujillo. 

This census collected information respect on sex, occupation, age, fertility, race, religion, marital status, nationality, literacy, ability to vote, and housing.

General results

Provincial and municipal results

See also 
 1920 Santo Domingo Census
 1950 Dominican Republic Census
 1970 Dominican Republic Census
 2010 Dominican Republic Census
 2022 Dominican Republic Census
 People of the Dominican Republic

Sources 
 The National office of the Census (1966). Fourth National Census of Population, 1960.

References 

Censuses in the Dominican Republic
1960 in the Dominican Republic
Dominican Republic